Gertrude Mary Woodward (1854–1939) was a British scientific illustrator. She illustrated the famous Piltdown man fossils and other works by Arthur Smith Woodward (unrelated), as well as works by zoologist Ray Lankester. She often created illustrations for the still published, earth science journal co-founded by her father, titled Geological Magazine.

Gallery

References

External links

Gertrude Mary Woodward archives at the Natural History Museum, London

1854 births
1939 deaths
Scientific illustrators
British women illustrators
English illustrators
Animal artists
Paleoartists